New Woodstock is a hamlet in the town of Cazenovia, Madison County, New York, United States. The zipcode is: 13122.

Notes

Hamlets in Madison County, New York
Hamlets in New York (state)
Cazenovia, New York